Amiran Totikashvili (born 21 July 1969 in Martkopi) is a Georgian judoka who competed for the Soviet Union in the 1988 Summer Olympics. There he won the bronze medal in the extra lightweight class. He is the current trainer of the Turkmenistan National Judo team.

He is also two times European champion 1988 in Pamplona and 1989 in Helsinki. He was the Bronze medalist in 1990 in Frankfurt.

Champion International Tournaments in Paris in 1990 and the Goodwill Games in Seattle.

Coach career 
In March 2019, it became known that Amiran Totikashvili would train Turkmenistan judo wrestlers for the 2020 Summer Olympics, which will be held in Tokyo.

References

External links
 

1969 births
Living people
Male judoka from Georgia (country)
Soviet male judoka
Olympic judoka of the Soviet Union
Judoka at the 1988 Summer Olympics
Olympic bronze medalists for the Soviet Union
Olympic medalists in judo
Medalists at the 1988 Summer Olympics
Goodwill Games medalists in judo
People from Kvemo Kartli
Competitors at the 1990 Goodwill Games